Salou Open is a yearly international draughts tournament. The tournament has been organized since 1998 in the second half of May in the resort of Salou, Spain.

Winners

References

External links
 Official website
 Salou Open in Tournaments base
 Salou Open - 2014 at Alldraughts
 Salou Open - 2014 at de Volkskrant
 Salou Open - 2016 at KNDB

Draughts competitions
Recurring sporting events established in 1998